Criptales is a 2020 British comedy-drama series, consisting of monologues, based on factual research and the experiences of British disabled people, since 1970. These were curated by disabled actor-writer Mat Fraser, with each episode written and performed by disabled artists.

Cast
Liz Carr as Meg
Ruth Madeley as Sue
Carly Houston as Annette
Jackie Hagan as Stacy Hadfield
Robert Softley Gale as Hamish
Mat Fraser as himself

Episodes

Nominations
Criptales was nominated for a BAFTA award for 'Short-form programme'.

References

External links
 

2020s British drama television series
2020 British television series debuts
2020 British television series endings
English-language television shows